Daniel Gagliardi (born January 21, 1997) is an American soccer player who plays as a goalkeeper for Syracuse Pulse in the NISA.

Career

Youth and college
Gagliardi played prep soccer at St. Thomas Aquinas High School in Fort Lauderdale, Florida. Gagliardi played club soccer with local side Plantation SC. He also spent a single season with USSDA side Kendall Soccer Club, making 14 appearances during their 2014–15 season.

Gagliardi played five years of college soccer at Florida International University, including a redshirted freshman season. During his time with the Panthers, Gagliardi made 34 appearances, and was named All-Conference USA Third Team in 2019.

While at college, Gagliardi also played in the NPSL in 2016 with Storm FC, and in 2017 and 2018, spent time with SIMA Águilas, Des Moines Menace and IMG Academy Bradenton of the USL PDL.

Professional career
On January 9, 2020, Gagliardi was drafted 32nd overall in the 2020 MLS SuperDraft by Vancouver Whitecaps FC. However, he did not sign with the club.

In February 2020, Gagliardi signed with USL League One side Fort Lauderdale CF ahead of their inaugural season. He made his professional debut on October 24, 2020, starting in the final game of the season to Union Omaha, which ended in a 1–0 defeat for Fort Lauderdale.

On January 19, 2021, Gagliardi signed with USL Championship side FC Tulsa.

In May 2022, Gagliardi joined NISA side Syracuse Pulse.

Personal
Gagliardi also holds Brazilian citizenship.

References

External links
 

1997 births
Living people
American soccer players
Association football goalkeepers
Des Moines Menace players
FC Tulsa players
FIU Panthers men's soccer players
Inter Miami CF II players
IMG Academy Bradenton players
National Independent Soccer Association players
National Premier Soccer League
People from Plantation, Florida
SIMA Águilas players
Soccer players from Florida
USL League One players
USL League Two players
Vancouver Whitecaps FC draft picks
Sportspeople from Broward County, Florida